Assabah is a daily Arabophone Moroccan newspaper.

History and profile
Assabah was established in 2000. It is a sister publication of L'Economiste and both are owned by Eco-Médias. Its 2012 circulation was 86,907 copies.

See also
 List of Moroccan newspapers

References

External links
Official site

2000 establishments in Morocco
Arabic-language newspapers
Mass media in Casablanca
S
Newspapers established in 2000
Société Nationale d'Investissement